Ricardo Pozas Arciniega (May 4, 1912, Amealco de Bonfil, Querétaro – January 19, 1994, Mexico City) was a distinguished Mexican anthropologist, scientific investigator and indigenista. He wrote the classic anthropological works Juan Pérez Jolote, biografía de un tzotzil and Los mazatecos y Chamula, un pueblo indio de los altos de Chiapas.

Arciniega's parents were Eduardo Pozas, an elementary school teacher, and Isabel Arciniega. Pozas began his studies in the Escuela Normal (Elementary Teacher's formation School) of San Juan del Río, Querétaro. After graduating he began teaching in Vizarrón de Montes, Querétaro, and later in San Sebastián de las Barrancas.

Then in 1929 he moved to Mexico City, where he taught in an elementary school for working-class children. Later he worked in Zamora, Michoacán. In 1938 he returned to Mexico City as a secondary school history teacher and a laboratory worker at the Escuela Nacional de Maestros. In 1940 he entered the Escuela Nacional de Antropología e Historia (ENAH; National School of Anthropology and History) as a student. It was there that he began his anthropological work. Pozas then went to the Universidad Nacional Autónoma de México (UNAM; National Autonomous University of Mexico) for postgraduate studies in sociology.

He worked as an ethnologist in the Museo Nacional de Antropología (National Museum of Anthropology) and as a researcher in the Instituto de Alfabetización para Maestros de Indígenas Monolingües (Literacy Institute for Teachers of Monolingual Indigenous People) of the Instituto Nacional Indigenista (National Indigenous Institute).

In UNAM he was one of the professors who founded the School of Political and Social Sciences, where he also founded the Sociological Research Workshops. His work at the university emphasized both teaching and research. He founded the journal Acta Sociológica, which had the objective of publishing the research works of the university students.

Near the end of his life, in recognition of his career and his dedication to anthropological and cultural research of the indigenous peoples of Mexico, he was awarded the Manuel Gamio Medal and the University Medal of Merit.

Works
Juan Pérez Jolote, biografía de un tzotzil. Mexico: Fondo de Cultura Económica, 1952.
El desarrollo de la comunidad : técnicas de investigación social. Mexico: Universidad Nacional Autónoma de México, 1961.
Los mazatecos y Chamula, un pueblo indio de los altos de Chiapas. Mexico: Fondo de Cultura Económica.
"Etnografía de los mazatecos", in Revista Mexicana de Estudios Antropológicos, v. XVI. Sociedad Mexicana de Antropología, 1960.
Chamula. Mexico: Instituto Nacional Indigenista, 1977. 
La Política Indigenista en México, with Gonzalo Aguirre Beltrán. Mexico: Instituto Nacional Indigenista, 1981. 
, with Isabel Horcasitas de Pozas. Mexico: Siglo XXI, 1985. 
Yis ma̱ i shö (yo voy a decir), with Enrique Margery Peña (editor) and Francisco Amighetti (illustrator). Costa Rica: Ministerio de Educación Pública, 1996 (posthumous).

References
 Homenaje a Ricardo Pozas Arciniega. Mexico: Universidad Nacional Autónoma de México, 1996. 
 Some biographical information from the government of Querétaro web site

1912 births
1994 deaths
Mexican anthropologists
Mexican sociologists
Mexican educators
Mexican people of Basque descent
Academic staff of the National Autonomous University of Mexico
People from Querétaro
20th-century anthropologists
People from Amealco de Bonfil